Grappa is an Italian alcoholic beverage. Grappa may also refer to:

Places 
 Bassano del Grappa, a city and comune in the Veneto region of northern Italy
 Monte Grappa, a mountain in the Veneto region of Italy
 Battle of Monte Grappa, a series of three World War I battles on Monte Grappa
 Borso del Grappa
 Cismon del Grappa
 Crespano del Grappa
 Paderno del Grappa
 Pove del Grappa
 Seren del Grappa

Food 
 Bastardo del Grappa, a traditional cheese
 Morlacco di Grappa, a cheese from Monte Grappa

Other uses 
 Grappa Music, A Norwegian music-publishing company